Cryptazeca subcylindrica is a species of gastropod in the family Cochlicopidae. It is endemic to France.

References

External links

Cryptazeca
Endemic molluscs of Metropolitan France
Gastropods described in 1877
Taxonomy articles created by Polbot